Talk of the Town may refer to:

Film 
 The Talk of the Town (1918 film), American film starring Lon Chaney, Sr.
 The Talk of the Town (1941 film), Swedish film
 The Talk of the Town (1942 film), American comedy/drama film
 Talk of the Town (1995 film), German film
 Talk of the Town (talk show), 1982 American comedy/talk cable television show
 Talk of the Town, 1996 short film by Lani Tupu

Literature 
 The Talk of the Town (novel), a 1999 novel by Ardal O'Hanlon
 Talk of the Town (2010 novel), a 2010 novel by Jacob Polley
 Talk of the Town (magazine), a 2003–2004 arts supplement of the Independent on Sunday
 "The Talk of the Town", a section in the magazine The New Yorker

Music 
 "Talk of the Town" (Pretenders song), 1980
 "Talk of the Town" (Jack Johnson song), 2006
 "Talk of the Town", a song by Jack Harlow on Come Home the Kids Miss You, 2022
 "Talk of the Town", a song by Elle King on Shake the Spirit, 2018
 "Talk of the Town", a song in the Fredo discography, 2021
 The Talk of the Town (album), a 1987 album by Houston Person
 Talk of the Town (active 2004–2011), an American a cappella group featuring Jerry Lawson
 Talk of the Town, a c. 2007 album by TBC
 The Talk of the Town, a 1905 musical by Seymour Hicks

Other uses 
 Talk of the Town (nightclub), a 1958–1982 nightclub in the Hippodrome in London
The Talk of the Town (horse) (1947–1976), a Tennessee Walking Horse

See also
 "It's the Talk of the Town", a 1933 song written by Jerry Livingston, Al J. Neiburg and Marty Symes
 Live at the Talk of the Town (disambiguation)